Anne of Green Gables: A New Beginning is a 2008 Canadian made-for-television drama film and the fourth and final film in Sullivan Entertainment's Anne of Green Gables series. It was released in 2008 on CTV. Before the broadcast, CTV had recently acquired the rights to the entire Anne catalogue including the 1985 miniseries.

Created to celebrate the 100th anniversary of Lucy Maud Montgomery's Anne of Green Gables novel, the film stars Barbara Hershey as the middle-aged Anne Shirley and 14-year-old Hannah Endicott-Douglas as a young Anne, with Shirley MacLaine playing matriarch Amelia Thomas. Kevin Sullivan wrote a completely new screenplay for the three-hour movie based on Montgomery's characters (serving as a prequel to his three previous miniseries movies broadcast originally on CBC) and not directly from her books. The story follows Anne's life before she arrives at Green Gables.

Plot 
Anne, now a middle-aged woman, is troubled by recent events in her life. Her husband, Gilbert, has been killed overseas while a medical doctor during World War II (an event that did not happen in the books). Her two daughters are preoccupied with their own families, and her adopted son Dominic has yet to return from the war. When a long-hidden secret is discovered under the floorboards at Green Gables, Anne retreats into her memories to relive her troubled early years prior to arriving as an orphan at Green Gables, and being adopted by the Cuthberts.

The impact of this difficult period has a far-reaching effect on this older woman, once she discovers the truth about her real parents. She begins a delicate search for her birth-father. It is a journey through a past fraught with danger, uncertainty, heartache, and joy. In the parade of humanity Anne encounters, she also faces the root of her desire to find true "kindred spirits," and an imagination to use her talents as a writer to inspire others.

Release 
The telefilm premiered on Sunday December 14, 2008 on CTV; it was broadcast in high definition. In the United States, it has aired on PBS member stations since November 2010. The film has a running time of 138 minutes. It was released on DVD on May 5, 2009, by Sullivan Entertainment.  The company also published a soundtrack, first available for download on January 8, 2009, and then on CD on June 16, 2009.

Prior to the film's debut, Key Porter Books published a novelization of the film by Kevin Sullivan in October 2008.

Cast

Production notes 
All of the movie's actual location photography was shot in various places around the Ontario area, using existing houses, streetscapes and natural environments. Period mansions were used as the backdrop for the Thomas residences, and an historic Quaker Boys School converted into the Bolingbroke Poorhouse for the film.

When they could not film on location, the production crew and special effects team employed the technology of the green screen and fully computerized to digitally create the background, or specific details that location filming could not produce.

Of the major cast members from the original trilogy of films, only Patricia Hamilton (Rachel Lynde) reprised her original character.  Barbara Hershey replaced Megan Follows as Anne, although Follows briefly appears in archive footage when Anne is reminiscing. Colleen Dewhurst, who had played Marilla Cuthbert in the first two miniseries and the spin-off series Road to Avonlea before her death in 1991, and Jonathan Crombie, who previously portrayed Gilbert Blythe, are also featured in archive footage presented as flashbacks. For the role of young Anne, Sullivan held a cross-Canada open casting call in July 2007, including submissions from YouTube, before Hannah Endicott-Douglas auditioned the part.

Reception
In its debut on CTV, the film was watched by 1,042,000 viewers, a number that was seen as low compared to Sullivan's earlier Anne productions.

The film was not well received by critics or fans. The Globe and Mail'''s Kate Taylor said the film, "never justifies its presumption in inventing a new creation story for a Canadian literary icon." Bill Brioux felt that "maybe Anne just doesn't age all that well. Maybe she is supposed to stay in freckles and pigtails, locked in that perfect P.E.I. prism Montgomery authored and Sullivan so artfully adapted when they both were in their 20s."

See alsoBefore Green Gables'', a prequel novel published in 2008.

References

External links
 Official page on Sullivan's Anne of Green Gables series
 
 L.M. Montgomery Online This scholarly site includes a blog, a bibliography of reference materials, and a complete filmography of all adaptations of Montgomery texts. See, in particular, the page for Anne of Green Gables: A New Beginning.

2008 television films
2008 films
2008 drama films
Anne of Green Gables films
Canadian drama television films
English-language Canadian films
Films directed by Kevin Sullivan
2000s Canadian films